Chebureki are deep-fried turnovers with a filling of ground or minced meat and onions. They are made with a single round piece of dough folded over the filling in a crescent shape. 

Chebureki is a national dish of Crimean Tatar cuisine. They are popular as snack and street food throughout the Caucasus, West Asia, Central Asia, Russia, Lithuania, Latvia, Estonia, Ukraine, Eastern Europe, as well as in Turkey and Romania.

Preparation
A cheburek is a half-round-shaped , filled with a very thin layer of ground beef or lamb which has been seasoned with ground onion and black pepper. The meat is layered thinly enough that it will cook fully when the sealed half-moon pocket is fried in sunflower oil or corn oil. The dough, made from flour, salt, and water, is soft and pliable, but not sticky. The dough is separated into small balls and each is rolled out with a thin rolling pin. Additional flour is added only as needed to prevent the dough from sticking.

Variations
Cheburek is called  ("raw ") in Turkey. It is very popular, especially in Eskişehir.

See also

 List of stuffed dishes
 Cantiq
 Curry puff
 Empanada
 Gözleme
 Haliva, a similar Circassian pastry
 Khuushuur, a similar kind of meat pastry in Mongolian cuisine
 Lángos
 Lörtsy, a similar kind of pastry in Finnish cuisine
 Pastel (food)
 Pasty
 Paste, a Mexican variation of the Cornish pasty
 Peremech
 Plăcintă
 Qutab
 Sha phaley, a similar Tibetan pastry

Notes

References

Savoury pies
Deep fried foods
Crimean cuisine
Tatar cuisine
Lithuanian cuisine
Ukrainian cuisine
Romanian cuisine
Turkish cuisine
Azerbaijani cuisine
Uzbekistani cuisine
Tajik cuisine
Russian cuisine
Soviet cuisine
Snack foods
Street food
Stuffed dishes
Street food in Russia
Turkish pastries